Best Friends Whenever is an American comedy television series created by Jed Elinoff and Scott Thomas that premiered on Disney Channel on June 26, 2015. Its final episode aired on December 11, 2016, after two seasons. The series stars Landry Bender, Lauren Taylor, Gus Kamp, Ricky Garcia, Benjamin Cole Royer, and Matthew Lewis Royer.

Premise 
Set in Portland, Oregon, two teenage girls named Cyd and Shelby are best friends living together while Cyd's parents are on an archaeological dig in Peru. After an accident in their neighbor Barry's science lab, they are given the ability to travel in time, provided they are thinking of the time they want to go to and are touching. When it comes to their trips to the future, they briefly find themselves strapped to tables in a futuristic lab and must figure out what this means while having various adventures along the way.

Cast and characters

Main 
 Landry Bender as Cyd Ripley, Shelby's best friend who is staying with Shelby's family while her parents are away in Peru. She owns a pet dog named Diesel.
 Lauren Taylor as Shelby Marcus, Cyd's best friend.
 Gus Kamp as Barry Eisenberg, an aspiring young scientist who lives in a Winnebago that is parked outside of Shelby's backyard that he also uses for his lab. One of his lasers deflecting off a cup of chemicals gave Cyd and Shelby the ability to travel through time.
 Ricky Garcia as Naldo Montoya, Barry's best friend and lab assistant. Barry calls him "Renaldo".
 Benjamin Cole Royer as Bret Marcus, Shelby's brother who is the twin brother of Chet.
 Matthew Lewis Royer as Chet Marcus, Shelby's brother who is the twin brother of Bret.

Recurring 
 Mary Passeri as Astrid, the mother of Shelby, Bret, and Chet.
 Kevin Symons as Norm, the father of Shelby, Bret, and Chet. He works as an accountant at GloboDigiDyne and later gets promoted to the company's Pelican Ball Room.
 Madison Hu as Marci, a friend of Cyd and Shelby who is always relaxed.
 Larry Joe Campbell as Mr. Doyle, a gossip-loving teacher at West Portland High School who teaches science and driver's education.
 Nora Dunn as Janet Smythe, an entrepreneur and the CEO of GloboDigiDyne who has invented many things in her life, starting with wireless objects. However, she is an evil mastermind who seeks to hunt down Cyd and Shelby and plans to figure out their time travel abilities and alter time so that she can take over the country. She is eventually defeated by future Cyd and Shelby and taken away by them to be imprisoned with other people like her.
 Bryana Salaz as Daisy, a time-displaced princess from the 1500s who ended up in Cyd and Shelby's time. Whenever Cyd and Shelby do a group hug with her, Cyd and Shelby end up briefly transported back in time to where Daisy is imprisoned by an unidentified person. During her time in the present, she lives with Naldo while trying to adapt to modern day cultures. It was later revealed that the unidentified person had trapped Daisy in the tower to keep her from being taken by Sebastian.

Production 
Best Friends Whenever was created by Jed Elinoff and Scott Thomas, who have also created Randy Cunningham: 9th Grade Ninja. On March 6, 2015, Disney ordered Best Friends Whenever with production starting the same month. The series was renewed for a second season by Disney Channel on February 29, 2016. The second season premiered on July 25, 2016. In February 2017, the cast took to social media to report that the series had not been renewed for a third season. On June 30, 2017, TV by the Numbers reported that the series had been canceled.

Episodes

Series overview

Season 1 (2015–16)

Season 2 (2016)

Broadcast 
The series airs on Disney Channel in Canada. It premiered on Disney Channel in Australia and New Zealand on October 16, 2015.

Reception

Critical 
Brian Lowry, writing for Variety, thought the series' pilot episode was formulaic and did not take full advantages of the time travel premise. In particular, the series "appears more content to focus on the humdrum details of Shelby and Cyd's frantic lives than, say, sending them back to meet Abraham Lincoln or ahead to a time of flying cars."

Ratings 
 

| link2             = List of Best Friends Whenever episodes#Season 2 (2016)
| episodes2         = 12
| start2            = 
| end2              = 
| startrating2      = 1.18
| endrating2        = 0.94
| viewers2           = |2}} 
}}

References

External links 
 

2010s American children's comedy television series
2010s American time travel television series
2015 American television series debuts
2016 American television series endings
Disney Channel original programming
English-language television shows
Television series by It's a Laugh Productions
Television shows set in Portland, Oregon